Google Helpouts was an online collaboration service from Google which launched in November 2013 and allowed users to share their expertise through live video and provide real-time help from their computers or mobile devices. As of April 20, 2015, Google closed Google Helpouts.

Operation
People offering help through Helpouts, called "providers," could be companies or individuals. Providers were required to be native English speakers and a resident of U.S., Canada, Ireland, U.K., Australia or New Zealand.  They created and maintained listings that explained what they offered, their qualifications, prices, and schedules. Providers were required to pass Google's screening process to qualify.

Every listing had a link to the provider's Helpouts calendar. Once a Helpout was scheduled, it could automatically be added to users' Google Calendar, and users could choose whether they wish to be notified through email or SMS.

All payments were done through Google Wallet. Prices were set by the providers, based on either a per minute or per Helpout session. At the end of each Helpout, users were asked to write a review. Helpouts offered a money-back guarantee. If a user was not satisfied with a Helpout, the user could apply for a refund within 72 hours from the end of their session. Google had a cancellation policy that stated that some providers may have a cancellation fee. In those cases customers were required to call in 24 hours prior to the session to avoid the fee, which was either 50% of the fixed session price or five times the per-minute rate.

On April 20, 2015, Google officially shut down Helpouts stating that the service hadn't, "grown at the pace we had expected."

Categories
Helpouts categorizes help into the following categories:
 Art & Music
 Computers & Electronics
 Cooking
 Education & Careers
 Fashion & Beauty
 Fitness & Nutrition
 Health
 Home & Garden

Citations

References
 "Google offers live video chats with experts through Helpouts service". The Indian Express. Retrieved November 5, 2013.
 "Google Helpouts Promises 'Real Help from Real People in Real Time' — for a Price". Time. Retrieved November 5, 2013.
 "Google introduces Helpouts to connect experts with advice-seekers via video". PC World (October 31, 2013). Retrieved May 11, 2013.
 "Google Helpouts will change the world (or not)". Computerworld. Retrieved May 11, 2013.
 "Google launches Helpouts: paid live video chats with experts". The Guardian. Retrieved May 11, 2013.
 "Google Launches Helpouts, Paid Video Chats With Experts To Address Whatever Is Bothering You Right Now". TechCrunch (July 24, 2013). Retrieved May 11, 2013.
 "Google Helpouts and Other News You Need to Know". Mashable (November 18, 2011). Retrieved May 11, 2013.
 "Google Helpouts Offer One-On-One Expert Help". ReadWrite. Retrieved May 11, 2013.
 "Google Helpouts Connects You With Experts via Video Chat". Lifehacker. Retrieved May 11, 2013.
 "Google Helpouts Is Here to Help You With Basically Anything". Gizmodo. Retrieved May 11, 2013.
 

Collaborative software
Helpouts